Turkish Space Systems, Integration and Test Centre (USET) is a spacecraft production and testing facility owned by the Ministry of National Defence and operated by Turkish Aerospace Industries (TAI). It is located in Ankara, Turkey. The facility's official inauguration took place on May 21, 2015, in presence of President Recep Tayyip Erdoğan.

Considered as a critical infrastructure, the centre was established within the framework of the Göktürk-1 project, which started in 2009, for the indigenous realization of satellite assembly, as well as for qualification and acceptance testing from design to launch phase. It was the product of an agreement between the Turkish Ministry of National Defence and the multinational space services company Telespazio in 2010. Situated within TAI's grounds in the Kazan district of Ankara Province, the budgeted cost of the facility is US$100 million.

USET is a technology centre, at which all satellites up to  mass can be assembled and tested in simulated space environmental conditions related to the orbit. Two satellites can be produced and tested at the simultaneously. The centre serves military and civilian institutions.

Development of the Türksat series communication satellites, starting with Türksat 5A, and Göktürk series earth observation satellites, will be carried out by Turkish engineers at this site.

At the end of November 2014, it was announced that the construction of the facility was completed, and the centre was put into operation. It is capable of the assembly, integration and testing of several satellites of type Low Earth orbit (LEO) and Geosynchronous orbit (GEO) with a mass up to five tonnes simultaneously. It has a direct connection to the airbase so that a transport by land becomes needless, offering advantages of security, economy and risk management.

The centre has the following capabilities:
 thermal vacuum tests,
 EMI/EMC tests,
 compact antenna measurement range (CATR) tests,
 solar array deployment tests,
 vibration tests,
 mass properties measurement,
 acoustic tests, and
 MLI preparation.

The advanced integration and environmental tests of Göktürk-1 is the first project to be carried out in the centre. After completion, the satellite will be sent to the launch site by TUSAŞ.

References

Space program of Turkey
Ministry of National Defense (Turkey)
Kahramankazan
Space technology research institutes
Buildings and structures completed in 2014
2014 establishments in Turkey
Buildings and structures in Ankara Province
21st-century architecture in Turkey